Antonio Ghislanzoni  (25 November 1824 – 16 July 1893) was an Italian journalist, poet, and novelist who wrote librettos for Verdi, among other composers, of which the best known are Aida and the revised version of La forza del destino.

Life and career

Ghislanzoni was born in Lecco, Lombardy, and studied briefly in a seminary, but was expelled for bad conduct in 1841. He then decided to study medicine in Pavia, but abandoned this after a short time to pursue a singing career as a baritone and to cultivate his literary interests.

In 1848, stimulated by the nationalist ideas of Mazzini, Ghislanzoni founded several republican newspapers in Milan but eventually had to take refuge in Switzerland. While travelling to Rome, where he wanted to help defend the nascent republic, Ghislanzoni was arrested by the French and briefly detained in Corsica.

In the mid-1850s, having forsaken the stage, Ghislanzoni became active in journalism in the bohemian circles of Milan, serving as director of Italia musicale and editor of the Gazzetta musicale di Milano. He also founded L'uomo di pietra the magazine Rivista minima, collaborating with, among others, Arrigo Boito.

In 1869, Ghislanzoni retired from journalism and returned to his native Lombardy, where he dedicated himself to literature and writing libretti for operas. He wrote many short stories in verse and diverse novels including Un suicidio a fior d'acqua (1864), Angioli nelle tenebre (1865), La contessa di Karolystria (1883), Abracadabra: Storia dell'avvenire (1884). His novel of theatrical life Gli artisti da teatro, (1865), was republished into the 20th century. He also published musical essays, the most important being Reminiscenze artistiche.

Ghislanzoni wrote some eighty-five libretti, including Edmea for Catalani (1866), Aida (1870), Fosca (1873) and Salvator Rosa (1874) for Gomes, I Lituani for Ponchielli (1874) and the second version of La forza del destino (1869). He also contributed a few verses to the revised translation into Italian of Verdi's Don Carlos.

Ghislanzoni died in Caprino Bergamasco, Bergamo in 1893 at age 68. He was an atheist.

Filmography
Aida, directed by Clemente Fracassi (1953)
Aida, directed by Claes Fellbom (1987)

See also

 Scapigliatura

References

External links
 
 
 

1824 births
1893 deaths
Italian journalists
Italian male journalists
Italian male poets
Italian opera librettists
Italian poets
People from Lecco
19th-century Italian singers
19th-century Italian journalists
Italian male novelists
Italian male dramatists and playwrights
19th-century poets
19th-century Italian novelists
19th-century Italian dramatists and playwrights
19th-century Italian male writers